The 2015 Newfoundland and Labrador Scotties Tournament of Hearts, the provincial women's curling championship of Newfoundland and Labrador was held January 15–18 at the Bally Haly Golf & Curling Club in St. John's, Newfoundland and Labrador. The winning team was the Heather Strong rink from the host Bally Haly Club, and she and her team represented Newfoundland and Labrador at the 2015 Scotties Tournament of Hearts in Moose Jaw, Saskatchewan.

Teams

Round-robin standings
Final round-robin standings

Round-robin results

Draw 1
Thursday, January 15, 8:30 pm

Draw 2
Friday, January 16, 3:00 pm

Draw 3
Friday, January 16, 8:30 pm

Draw 4
Saturday, January 17, 9:30 am

Draw 5
Saturday, January 17, 3:00 pm

Finals
The final round between the top two teams at the end of the round robin followed the double knockout rule, which states that the first team in the finals to have two losses in the event would be knocked out of contention. Since Strong had no losses, Guzzwell would have had to defeat her twice in order to secure the title.

Game 1
Sunday, January 18, 9:30 am

References

External links
Coverage on CurlingZone

Newfoundland and Labrador Scotties Tournament of Hearts
Curling in Newfoundland and Labrador
Sport in St. John's, Newfoundland and Labrador
Newfoundland and Labrador Scotties Tournament of Hearts